The Falconar F11 Sporty is a Canadian amateur-built aircraft, that was designed by Chris Falconar and produced by Falconar Avia. Falconar supplied it as a kit or as plans for amateur construction. Today both the F11A and E models are available as plans from Manna Aviation.

Design and development
The F11 is a variant of the Jodel D11. Falconar indicated that it incorporates a larger cockpit, simplified fittings, shoulder harnesses and aerodynamic improvements to improve stall characteristics.

Hans Teijgeler of Jodel.com says that the F11 varies from the D11 by using a new wing design, with new simplified spar and rib design and the dihedral point moved inboard, allowing the outer portion to fold for ground transport or storage, but at the cost of added weight. Teijgeler describes the wing as "less efficient". Teijgeler also notes that the F11 uses larger and heavier engines with higher fuel consumption. Teijgeler says of the Falconar F11, "the Falconar 'Jodel' should not be looked upon as a Jodel, but as a Falconar. This is [n]either good or bad. Just a fact to take into account"

The aircraft is made from wood, with its flying surfaces covered in doped aircraft fabric. Construction time from the supplied kit varies depending on the model built.

The F11 was later developed into the larger Falconar F12A Cruiser, a two-seater with an option of a third seat.

Operational history
By November 2012, 20 examples had been registered with Transport Canada, 13 in the United States with the Federal Aviation Administration and two with the CAA in the United Kingdom.

Variants
F11A Sporty
Construction time from the supplied kit is 1200 hours. One hundred reported completed and flown by 2011. Options for this model include flaps, vertical coil spring main landing gear, tricycle gear, auxiliary fuel tanks, a three piece folding wing and floats for water operations.
F11E Sporty
Construction time from the supplied kit is 1000 hours. One reported completed and flown by 2011

Specifications (F11A)

References

External links

F11A official website
F11E official website

Homebuilt aircraft
F11 Sporty
Single-engined tractor aircraft